Lac de Divonne is an artificial lake at Divonne-les-Bains, France. The lake has a surface area of approx. .

Divonne